Gelato is a style of ice cream from Italy.

Gelato may also refer to:

 Gelato (software), a graphics rendering program
 Gelato Federation, a former coalition of institutions supporting Linux on the Itanium architecture
 Gelato (mixtape), by rapper Young Dolph